State police, provincial police or regional police are a type of sub-national territorial police force found in nations organized as federations, typically in North America, South Asia, and Oceania. These forces typically have jurisdiction over the relevant sub-national jurisdiction, and may cooperate in law enforcement activities with municipal or national police where either exist.

Argentina
In Argentina, as a federal country, each province has its own independent police force and its responsible of its funding, training and equipment. State police agencies are responsible of all the territory of a determinate state. There is almost no municipal/local law enforcement in Argentina, and if there is, they are generally limited to traffic duties.

Australia

Prior to the Federation of Australia, each Colony within Australia had numerous police forces, but these were largely amalgamated well before Federation.

Today each state of Australia, as well as the Northern Territory, has its own state police force. Municipalities do not have police forces and it is left to the state forces to police all geographic areas within their respective states. Australia does have a national police force, the Australian Federal Police, whose role is to enforce the laws of the Commonwealth, both criminal law and civil law, as well as to protect the interests of the Commonwealth, both domestically and internationally. The AFP does, however, provide policing for the Australian Capital Territory, Jervis Bay Territory, and Australia's other external territories such as Norfolk Island, Christmas Island and the Cocos (Keeling) Islands. 

The state and territory police forces are:
 New South Wales Police Force
 Northern Territory Police
 Queensland Police Service
 South Australia Police
 Tasmania Police
 Victoria Police
 Western Australia Police

Brazil

Each state in Brazil has two state police forces:

Civil Police — the State criminal investigative police. 
Military Police — they are uniformed gendarmerie forces fulfilling roles as State police. They are a reserve branch of the Brazilian armed forces but do not perform regular Military Police duties as they are performed by service police such as the Army Police, etc.

 PCAC - Polícia Civil do Estado do Acre
 PMAC - Polícia Militar do Estado do Acre (en)
 PCAL - Polícia Civil do Estado de Alagoas
 PMAL - Polícia Militar do Estado de Alagoas 
 PCAP - Polícia Civil do Estado do Amapá
 PMAP - Polícia Militar do Estado do Amapá
 PCAM - Polícia Civil do Estado do Amazonas
 PMAM - Polícia Militar do Estado do Amazonas
 PCBA - Polícia Civil do Estado da Bahia
 PMBA - Polícia Militar do Estado da Bahia
 PCCE - Polícia Civil do Estado do Ceará
 PMCE - Polícia Militar do Estado do Ceará
 PCDF - Polícia Civil do Distrito Federal (en)
 PMDF - Polícia Militar do Distrito Federal
 PCES - Polícia Civil do Estado do Espírito Santo
 PMES - Polícia Militar do Estado do Espírito Santo (en)
 PCGO - Polícia Civil do Estado de Goiás
 PMGO - Polícia Militar do Estado de Goiás (en)
 PCMA - Polícia Civil do Estado do Maranhão
 PMMA - Polícia Militar do Estado do Maranhão
 PCMT - Polícia Civil do Estado do Mato Grosso
 PMMT - Polícia Militar do Estado do Mato Grosso
 PCMS - Polícia Civil do Estado do Mato Grosso do Sul
 PMMS - Polícia Militar do Estado do Mato Grosso do Sul
 PCMG - Polícia Civil do Estado de Minas Gerais
 PMMG - Polícia Militar do Estado de Minas Gerais (en)
 PCPA - Polícia Civil do Estado do Pará
 PMPA - Polícia Militar do Estado do Pará
 PCPB - Polícia Civil do Estado da Paraíba
 PMPB - Polícia Militar do Estado da Paraíba
 PCPR - Polícia Civil do Estado do Paraná
 PMPR - Polícia Militar do Estado do Paraná (en)
 PCPE - Polícia Civil do Estado de Pernambuco
 PMPE - Polícia Militar do Estado de Pernambuco
 PCPI - Polícia Civil do Estado do Piauí
 PMPI - Polícia Militar do Estado do Piauí
 PCERJ - Polícia Civil do Estado do Rio de Janeiro (en)
 PMERJ - Polícia Militar do Estado do Rio de Janeiro (en)
 PCRN - Polícia Civil do Estado do Rio Grande do Norte
 PMRN - Polícia Militar do Estado de Rio Grande do Norte
 PCRS - Polícia Civil do Estado do Rio Grande do Sul
 BMRS - Brigada Militar do Rio Grande do Sul
 PCRO - Polícia Civil do Estado de Rondônia
 PMRO - Polícia Militar do Estado de Rondônia
 PCRR - Polícia Civil do Estado de Roraima
 PMRR - Polícia Militar do Estado de Roraima
 PCSC - Polícia Civil do Estado de Santa Catarina
 PMSC - Polícia Militar do Estado de Santa Catarina
 PCESP - Polícia Civil do Estado de São Paulo
 PMESP - Polícia Militar do Estado de São Paulo (en)
 PCSE - Polícia Civil do Estado de Sergipe
 PMSE - Polícia Militar do Estado de Sergipe
 PCTO - Polícia Civil do Estado do Tocantins
 PMTO - Polícia Militar do Estado do Tocantins

Canada

Law enforcement in Canada operates at the federal, provincial, and local levels. Three provinces of Canada have a dedicated police force, with jurisdiction over some or all of the province:
 Ontario Provincial Police (Ontario: provincial highways and waterways, provincial government buildings and officials, unincorporated areas)
 Royal Newfoundland Constabulary (Newfoundland and Labrador: St. John's Metropolitan Area, Corner Brook, and Labrador West)
 Sûreté du Québec (Quebec)

The federal Royal Canadian Mounted Police (RCMP) provides provincial-level policing in the remaining land area of Newfoundland and Labrador, as well as the remaining seven provinces and three territories. The RCMP began being contracted to provide provincial policing in the late 1920s as provincial police forces were disbanded and their duties contracted out to provincial divisions of the RCMP. The last provincial police force to be disbanded, the British Columbia Provincial Police, existed from the mid-19th century until its jurisdiction was transferred to RCMP "E" Division on August 15, 1950.

Provinces which have disbanded their provincial police may retain other provincial law enforcement agencies, such as sheriff services or conservation officers. For example, the Alberta Sheriffs Branch is responsible for traffic enforcement in Alberta together with the RCMP, despite being a law enforcement agency and not a police force.

Germany

The Landespolizei (or LaPo) is a term used in the Federal Republic of Germany to denote the law enforcement services that perform law enforcement duties in the States of Germany. The German federal constitution leaves the majority of law enforcement responsibilities to the 16 states of the country.

Baden-Württemberg Police
Bavarian State Police
Berlin Police
Brandenburg Police
Bremen Police
Hamburg Police
Hesse State Police
Lower Saxony Police
Mecklenburg-Vorpommern Police
North Rhine-Westphalia Police
Rhineland-Palatinate Police
Saarland Police
Saxony Police
Saxony-Anhalt Police
Schleswig-Holstein Police
Thuringia Police

There also are several auxiliary state police forces.

Baden-Württemberg Voluntary Police Service
Bavarian Security Watch
Brandenburg Security Partner
Hesse Voluntary Police Service
Saxony Security Watch

India

Each state and union territory has a state police force and its own distinct State Police Services, headed by the Commissioner of Police (State) or Director General of Police (DGP) who is an Indian Police Service officer. The IPS is not a law enforcement agency in its own right; rather it is the body to which all senior police officers of all states belong regardless of the agency for whom they work. The state police is responsible for maintaining law and order in townships of the state and the rural areas.

Mexico

Each of the 32 states of Mexico maintains a separate law enforcement agency or Policía Estatal. Each of these state forces is tasked with the protection of their citizens, keeping local order and combating insecurity and drug trafficking. Certain states including Veracruz and Nuevo León have a new model of police force designated as Civilian Forces (Fuerza Civil).

 Aguascalientes State Police
 Baja California State Police
 Baja California Sur State Police
 Campeche State Police
 Chiapas State Police
 Chihuahua State Police
 Coahuila State Police
 Colima State Police
 Durango State Police
 Guanajuato State Police
 Guerrero State Police
 Hidalgo State Police
 Jalisco State Police
 Mexico City Police, a special case in both state and municipal duties throughout the 16 Boroughs of Mexico City
 State of Mexico Police
 Michoacán State Police (Replaced in 2020 with Michoacán State Highway Patrol)
 Morelos State Police
 Nayarit State Police
 Nuevo León Civil Force
 Oaxaca State Police
 Puebla State Police
 Querétaro State Police
 Quintana Roo State Police
 San Luis Potosí State Police
 Sinaloa State Police
 Sonora State Police
 Tabasco State Police
 Tamaulipas State Police
 Tlaxcala State Police
 Veracruz State Police (Replaced with Civil Force in 2014)
 Yucatán State Police
 Zacatecas State Police

Spain
In Spain there are autonomous police forces in four of its nineteen autonomous communities. 

 Ertzainas in the Basque Country
 Mossos d'Esquadra in Catalonia
 Policía Foral in Navarre 
 Policía Canaria in the Canary Islands
Apart from this, some autonomous communities (Andalusia, Aragon, Asturias, Galicia and Valencian Community) have a special division part of the National Police Corps and autonomous government of each community.

United States

In the United States, state police (also termed highway patrol, state patrol, or state highway patrol) are a police body unique to 49 of the U.S. states, having statewide authority to conduct law enforcement activities and criminal investigations. Hawaii, despite a widely dispersed archipelago and having four separate county-based police agencies, still has its own statewide police agency.

In general, these police agencies perform functions outside the jurisdiction of the county sheriff, such as enforcing traffic laws on state highways and interstate expressways, overseeing the security of the state capitol complex, protecting the governor, training new officers for local police forces too small to operate an academy, providing technological and scientific services, supporting local police and helping to coordinate multi-jurisdictional task force activity in serious or complicated cases in those states that grant full police powers statewide. A general trend has been to bring all of these agencies under a state Department of Public Safety. Additionally, they may serve under different state departments such as the highway patrol under the state Department of Transportation and the marine patrol under the state Department of Natural Resources.

Twenty-two U.S. states use the term "State Police", fifteen use the term "Highway Patrol", seven use the term "State Patrol", and three use the term "State Highway Patrol", while Alaska's agency is the "Division of Alaska State Troopers". The term "highway patrol" tends to be more common in the southeast and mountain west states.

 Alabama Highway Patrol
 Alaska State Troopers
 Arizona Highway Patrol
 Arkansas State Police
 California Highway Patrol 
 Colorado State Patrol
 Connecticut State Police
 Delaware State Police
 Florida Highway Patrol
 Georgia State Patrol
 Hawaii State Sheriff
 Idaho State Police
 Illinois State Police
 Indiana State Police
 Iowa State Patrol
 Kansas Highway Patrol
 Kentucky State Police
 Louisiana State Police
 Maine State Police
 Maryland State Police
 Massachusetts State Police
 Michigan State Police
 Minnesota State Patrol
 Mississippi Highway Patrol
 Missouri State Highway Patrol
 Montana Highway Patrol
 Nebraska State Patrol
 Nevada State Police
 New Hampshire State Police
 New Jersey State Police
 New Mexico State Police
 New York State Police
 North Carolina State Highway Patrol
 North Dakota Highway Patrol
 Ohio State Highway Patrol
 Oklahoma Highway Patrol
 Oregon State Police
 Pennsylvania State Police
 Rhode Island State Police
 South Carolina Highway Patrol
 South Dakota Highway Patrol
 Tennessee Highway Patrol
 Texas Highway Patrol
 Utah Highway Patrol
 Vermont State Police
 Virginia State Police
 Washington State Patrol
 West Virginia State Police
 Wisconsin State Patrol 
 Wyoming Highway Patrol

In addition, all the territories of the United States have a police force with similar territory-wide authority: 

 American Samoa Department of Public Safety
 Guam Police Department
 Northern Mariana Islands Department of Public Safety
 Puerto Rico Police
 U.S. Virgin Islands Police Department

See also 
 Highway patrol
 Traffic police
 Traffic warden

References

External links
 PoliceLink.com
 State Trooper Directory
 State Law Enforcement Directory

Law enforcement in the United States
Law enforcement units